The Newfound River is a  tributary of the South Anna River in east-central Virginia in the United States.  Via the South Anna, Pamunkey and York rivers, it is part of the watershed of Chesapeake Bay.

The Newfound River rises in southeastern Louisa County and flows generally eastward through western Hanover County.

See also
List of Virginia rivers

References

DeLorme (2005).  Virginia Atlas & Gazetteer.  Yarmouth, Maine: DeLorme.  .

Rivers of Virginia
Tributaries of the York River (Virginia)
Rivers of Louisa County, Virginia